Benjamin S. W. Clark (May 27, 1829 – October 19, 1912) was an American merchant and politician from New York. He was the first New York State Superintendent of Public Works.

Biography
He was born in Franklin County, New York to Samuel Smith Clark (1801–1870) and Jane Ann (Wead) Clark (1806–1872) on May 27, 1829. Samuel Smith Clark was Franklin County Clerk from 1832 to 1834. Samuel's father was Benjamin Clark who was First Judge of the Franklin County Court from 1825 to 1829. In 1851, Benjamin S. W. Clark married Adaline W. Meigs.

He was Cashier of the Farmers National Bank of Malone. He was Franklin County Treasurer from 1858 to 1860, and later Clerk for the Board of Supervisors of Franklin County.

In March 1876, he was appointed by Governor Samuel J. Tilden an Inspector of State Prisons to fill the vacancy caused by the death of Moss K. Platt. He was appointed Warden of Sing Sing in 1877.

He was the first New York State Superintendent of Public Works under the State constitutional amendment of 1876, appointed after a year-long struggle between Governor Lucius Robinson and a hostile New York State Senate which had rejected the appointment of Robinson's first three nominees, George B. McClellan, Charles S. Fairchild and Daniel Magone.

Around 1900 he was a New York State Bank Examiner.

He died on October 19, 1912 in Malone, New York and was buried at the Morningside Cemetery in Malone.

References

External links
Gravestone transcription at RootsWeb

1829 births
1912 deaths
People from Franklin County, New York
New York State Prison Inspectors
New York State Superintendents of Public Works
Wardens of Sing Sing
People from Malone, New York
19th-century American politicians